Emanuele Busnaghi (born 13 February 1972), known professionally as Thema, is an Italian rapper.

Biography 
Born in Milan and growing up in Rodano, he is a rapper component of Gemelli Diversi from 1996.
He began his musical career alongside THG in the group La Cricca. He joined the Spaghetti Funk in 1996, meeting Grido and Strano, and giving life to the famous Italian group.

Discography

With Gemelli DiVersi 
 Gemelli DiVersi (album) (1998)
 4x4 (2000)
 Come piace a me (2001)
 Fuego (2002)
 Fuego Special Edition (2003)
 Reality Show (2004)
 Reality Show – Dual Disc (2005)
 Boom!(2007)
 Senza fine (2009)

 Collaborations 
 1996: Articolo 31, Grido, Space One – Spaghetti Funk 1997: Dj Enzo, Grido – Ricorda 1998: Articolo 31, Grido, Space One – Vai Bello 1998: Articolo 31, Space One – Non c'è Sveglia 1999: Articolo 31, Grido, - Il Mio Consiglio 2001: Space One, Grido, J-Ax, Posi Argento – A.A.D.D.S.S 2002: Articolo 31, Space One, Tony Fine – Passa il funk 2007: Space One, J-Ax, Grido, THG – Amici un cazzo''

References 

Italian rappers
1972 births
Living people